Car 54, Where Are You? is an American sitcom that aired on NBC from September 1961 to April 1963. Filmed in black and white, the series starred Joe E. Ross as Gunther Toody and Fred Gwynne as Francis Muldoon, two mismatched New York City police officers who patrol the fictional 53rd precinct in The Bronx. Car 54 was their patrol car. 

The series had a rotating group of directors, including Al De Caprio, Stanley Prager, and series creator Nat Hiken. Filming was done both on location and at Biograph Studios in the Bronx.

Synopsis
The series follows the adventures of New York City Police Department officers Gunther Toody (badge #1432) (Joe E. Ross) and Francis Muldoon (badge #723 and #1987 in early episodes) (Fred Gwynne), assigned to Patrol Car 54. Toody is short, stocky, nosy, and not very bright, and he lives with his loud, domineering wife Lucille (Beatrice Pons). College-educated Muldoon is very tall, quiet, and more intellectual. A shy bachelor, he lives with his mother and two younger sisters. He is reluctant to get married. 

Much of the series is set in the station house, with commanding officer Captain Block (Paul Reed) ordering his men to answer neighborhood police calls or investigate baffling cases that have stymied the force at large. Toody and Muldoon often blunder into these cases, encountering the criminals accidentally and proceeding on a wrong assumption. By sheer perseverance, inadvertence, and luck, Toody and Muldoon bring each case to a successful conclusion.

Cast
Joe E. Ross as Officer Gunther Toody
Fred Gwynne as Officer Francis Muldoon
Beatrice Pons as Lucille Toody
Al Lewis as Officer Leo Schnauser
Charlotte Rae as Sylvia Schnauser
Hank Garrett as Officer Ed Nicholson
Paul Reed as Capt. Paul Block
Bruce Kirby as Officer Kissel
Jimmy Little as Sgt. Jim McBride
Joe Warren as Officer Steinmetz
Nipsey Russell as Officer Anderson
Ossie Davis as Officer Omar Anderson
Frederick O'Neal as Officer Wallace
Jim Gormley as Officer Nelson
Albert Henderson as Officer Dennis O'Hara
Ruth Masters as Mrs. Muldoon, Francis's mother
Patricia Bright as Mrs. Claire Block
Martha Greenhouse as Rose, Lucille's sister
Nathaniel Frey as Sergeant Abrams
Jerome Guardino as Officer Antonnucci

Episode list

Production
Many of the scripts were written by Nat Hiken, who won an "Outstanding Directorial Achievement in Comedy" Emmy Award for his work on the series. 

Hiken had previously produced The Phil Silvers Show in New York; it was a military comedy with Silvers (as Sgt. Bilko) and his gang of comical soldiers. Hiken recruited many of the Bilko alumni for this new series. Joe E. Ross and Fred Gwynne had featured roles on the Bilko show, and Beatrice Pons was hired to reprise her old role of Ross's wife. Other veterans from the Bilko show were Paul Reed, Al Lewis, Charlotte Rae, Jimmy Little, Jack Healy, Frederick O'Neal, Martha Greenhouse, Bob Hastings, Billy Sands, and Gerald Hiken.

Some supporting players on Car 54 were so well received that they were brought back for additional episodes. Molly Picon played Mrs. Bronson, an enterprising matron who made life miserable for city authorities but always adhered strictly to the law, forcing her whims to be accommodated. Larry Storch played Charlie, the town drunk, whose constant scrapes with the police compelled Toody and Muldoon to rehabilitate him. Gene Baylos was the hapless Benny the Bookie, whose attempts at swearing off gambling always involved Toody and Muldoon. Carl Ballantine appeared as Al, Toody's imperious brother-in-law, who commanded instant obedience from his wife, Rose (Martha Greenhouse).

Cars
So that they would not be mistaken for actual police cars during location filming, the cars used for the series were painted red and white, which appeared as the proper shade of gray on black-and-white film to replicate NYPD cars of that era, which were black and green, with a white roof and trunk.

Three cars were used as the title vehicle during the series: a 1961 Plymouth Belvedere during most of the first season, followed by a 1962, and later a 1963, Plymouth Savoy.

Theme song
The theme song's lyrics were written by series creator, writer, and occasional director, Nat Hiken, with music by John Strauss.

There's a holdup in the Bronx,
Brooklyn's broken out in fights;
There's a traffic jam in Harlem
That's backed up to Jackson Heights;
There's a Scout troop short a child,
Khrushchev's due at Idlewild;
Car 54, Where Are You?

The line "Khrushchev's due at Idlewild" refers to Soviet leader Nikita Khrushchev. In September 1960, a year before the series began, Khrushchev flew to New York's Idlewild Airport (now John F. Kennedy International Airport) to attend the United Nations General Assembly.

Broadcast history
Car 54, Where Are You? originally aired Sunday evenings, 8:30–9:00 p.m. on NBC, following Walt Disney's Wonderful World of Color and preceding Bonanza. The network run of Car 54 was sponsored by Procter & Gamble.

Guest stars

Several New York-based celebrities, including Hugh Downs, Mitch Miller, Jan Murray, and Sugar Ray Robinson, appeared as themselves. Among others cast in various episodes are:

Carl Ballantine
Gene Baylos
Sorrell Booke
Tom Bosley
Heywood Hale Broun
Wally Cox
Dana Elcar
Dan Frazer
Alice Ghostley
Arlene Golonka
Bruce Gordon
Margaret Hamilton 
Bob Hastings
Katherine Helmond
Don Keefer
Jake LaMotta
Shari Lewis
Hal Linden
Judith Lowry
Simon Oakland
Molly Picon
B.S. Pully
Charles Nelson Reilly
Jane Rose
Billy Sands
Jean Stapleton
Maureen Stapleton
Larry Storch

Primetime Emmy Awards
Car 54, Where Are You? was nominated for four Primetime Emmy Awards, earning one.
 1961–1962 (presented May 22, 1962)
 Outstanding Directorial Achievement in Comedy: Nat HikenWon
 Outstanding Program Achievement in the Field of HumorNominated (Winner: The Bob Newhart Show)
 Outstanding Writing Achievement in Comedy: Nat Hiken, Tony Webster, Terry RyanNominated (Winner: Carl Reiner for The Dick Van Dyke Show)
 1962–1963 (presented May 26, 1963)
 Outstanding Writing Achievement in Comedy: Nat HikenNominated (Winner: Carl Reiner for The Dick Van Dyke Show)

Syndication
Car 54, Where Are You? first entered into syndication in January 1964. It began airing on the cable channel Nick at Nite in 1987 and ran on the network until 1990. It was seen for less than one year on the short-lived Ha! Channel in 1990–91 and also aired on another Viacom-owned cable channel, Comedy Central, in the early 1990s. In 2016, the show aired early Sunday mornings on MeTV, and currently airs Monday through Friday on its sister network Decades.

1994 film
Car 54, Where Are You? was made into a 1994 film, shot mainly in Toronto, starring John C. McGinley as Muldoon, David Johansen as Toody, and Rosie O'Donnell as Toody's wife Lucille. Though made in 1990, it was not released until 1994 due to the bankruptcy of Orion Pictures. Original cast members Al Lewis and Nipsey Russell appeared in the film, which underperformed both critically and commercially upon release.

Home media
In the early 1990s, Republic Pictures Home Video released some episodes on VHS. Shanachie Entertainment announced in late 2010 it was releasing season one on DVD Region 1 on February 22, 2011. The second and final season was released on April 24, 2012.

In popular culture
The show's theme song is parodied as “Mario, Where Are You?” in an Atari commercial for Mario Bros.

In the 1966 film Munster, Go Home! Herman Munster (also played by Fred Gwynne) starts calling for police agencies, eventually yelling, “Car 54, where are you?”

See also
 List of television shows filmed in New York City

References
Notes

Further reading 
 Car 54, Where Are You?, by Martin Grams, Jr. (2009). Albany: BearManor Media. .

External links

 
A Tribute to Nat Hiken's Car 54 Where Are You?

1961 American television series debuts
1963 American television series endings
1960s American sitcoms
Black-and-white American television shows
English-language television shows
Fictional portrayals of the New York City Police Department
NBC original programming
1960s American police comedy television series
Television shows adapted into films
Television series by CBS Studios
Television shows set in the Bronx
Television shows filmed in New York City